Outside Providence (1988) is an English language novel by American writer, producer, and director Peter Farrelly.

Plot summary
Largely an autobiographical tale, the novel revolves around Timothy "Dildo" Dunphy, a ne'er-do-well from the city of Pawtucket, Rhode Island, which borders Providence. After Dunphy falls in with a bad element at home, his father, a widower, exiles him to the fictional Cornwall Academy (a thin guise for Kent School located near Kent, Connecticut).

Over time, Dunphy struggles with issues including class structure, loyalty, first love, and his ongoing issues with his father. Dunphy finds that his fellow prep-school students merely represent a wealthier, more polished class of delinquent than the friends he has left at home.

The novel was Farrelly's fledgling effort, and served as his thesis when he graduated from the creative writing program at Columbia University.

Film adaptation

Farrelly adapted his novel into a screenplay for a film of the same name (1999).

References

Pawtucket, Rhode Island
1988 American novels
American autobiographical novels
American novels adapted into films
Novels set in Connecticut
Novels set in Rhode Island